The First Broad River is a tributary of the Broad River, about 60 mi (95 km) long  in western North Carolina in the United States. Via the Broad and Congaree Rivers, it is part of the watershed of the Santee River, which flows to the Atlantic Ocean.

The First Broad River rises on South Mountain in northeastern Rutherford County and initially flows southeastwardly into Cleveland County to the town of Lawndale, where it turns southward. After passing to the west of Shelby, the river joins the Broad River from the north in southern Cleveland County.

See also 
 List of North Carolina rivers
 Second Broad River

References 

 

Rivers of North Carolina
Rivers of Cleveland County, North Carolina
Rivers of Rutherford County, North Carolina